Epinotia niveipalpa is a moth of the family Tortricidae. It is found in Vietnam.

The wingspan is 25 mm. The ground colour of the forewings is pale brownish, but the costa is browner and the dorsal area is brownish cream and paler in the basal half, with some scattered black dots. The hindwings are brown.

Etymology
The name refers to colouration of the labial palpus and is derived from Latin niveus (meaning snow white).

References

Moths described in 2009
Eucosmini
Moths of Asia
Taxa named by Józef Razowski